The Information Processing Society of Japan ("IPSJ") is a Japanese learned society for computing. Founded in 1960, it is headquartered in Tokyo, Japan.  IPSJ publishes a magazine and several professional journals mainly in Japanese, and sponsors conferences and workshops, also mainly conducted in Japanese.  It has nearly 20,000 members.  IPSJ is a full member of the International Federation for Information Processing. Its current president is Katsumi Emura, appointed in 2020.

Publications

IPSJ publishes one magazine, several journals, and several peer-reviewed transactions.  Most of these publications primarily carry articles and peer-reviewed papers in Japanese, but accept some  articles in English, especially for transactions special issues.

 Joho Shori magazine
 Journal of Information Processing
 Journal of Digital Practice
 Transactions on:
 Programming (PRO)
 Database (TOD)
 Consumer Device & System (CDS)
 Bioinformatics (TBIO) (English only)
 Computer Vision and Applications (CVA) (English only)
 Mathematical Modeling and its Applications (TOM)
 Advanced Computing Systems (ACS)
 Digital Contents (DCON)
 System Design LSI Methodology (T-SDLM) (English only)
 IPSJ Online Transactions (open access republishing of English-language papers previously published in primarily-Japanese transactions)

Fellows

Every year since 1999, IPSJ has inducted a new group of Japanese Fellows. It has no foreign or international fellows and most, if not all, fellows are Japanese.

Online Computer Museum

IPSJ maintains an online Computer Museum of computers developed in Japan, featuring equipment ranging from old mechanical calculators to modern supercomputers, in both English and Japanese.

References

External links
 
 IPSJ Computer Museum

Professional associations based in Japan
Information technology organizations based in Asia
Learned societies of Japan
Organizations established in 1960
Computer science-related professional associations
1960 establishments in Japan